The United Railways and Electric Company was a street railway company in the Baltimore Metropolitan Area of the U.S. state of Maryland from 1899 to 1935.

In 1900, the company built the Power Plant in Baltimore's Inner Harbor to provide electrical power to the system. The system suffered extensive damage during the Great Baltimore Fire of 1904, but the company rebuilt under the supervision of its president, John Mifflin Hood.

United Railways declared bankruptcy in 1933. The company was reorganized in 1935 as the Baltimore Transit Company. In 1970 the transit company was absorbed into the Maryland Transit Administration, a public agency.

List of streetcar lines
The date that the line was replaced with a bus or abandoned (the day after the last full day of streetcar operation) is shown.

Radiating from downtown in a clockwise order
Falls Road Line: April 24, 1949 (ca. 1914 along Falls Road south of 36th Street)
Roland Park Line: April 14, 1940
Lakeside Line: January 29, 1950
St. Paul Street Line: June 22, 1947
Boulevard Line: June 22, 1947
Bedford Square Line: June 22, 1947
Guilford Avenue Elevated: January 1950
Towson Line (York Road; Govanstown): November 3, 1963
Harford Road Line: June 17, 1956 (October 4, 1936, north of Parkville)
Belair Road Line (Gay Street): November 3, 1963
Monument Street Line: March 21, 1948
Orleans Street Line
East Fayette Street Line
Highlandtown Line: July 29, 1950
Back and Middle Rivers Line: February 11, 1942
Sparrows Point Line (Dundalk): August 31, 1958
Point Breeze Line: July 25, 1948
Broadway Line: May 9, 1948
Patterson Park Line: May 1948
Highlandtown Short Line: March 5, 1950
Hudson Street Line: June 8, 1952
Canton Line (Highland Avenue): June 8, 1952
Fort Avenue Line (Fort McHenry): December 13, 1948
Ferry Bar Line: July 5, 1923
Curtis Bay Line: March 21, 1948
Westport Line: June 22, 1947
Washington Boulevard Line (Columbia Avenue): January 1, 1939
Halethorpe Line (Wilkens Avenue): November 16, 1935
Catonsville Line (Frederick Road; Irvington): November 3, 1963
West Baltimore Street Line: May 9, 1948
Ellicott City Line (North Bend; Rolling Road): June 19, 1955 (September 18, 1954, east of Catonsville Junction)
Edmondson Avenue Line (Windsor Hills): November 3, 1963
Garrison Boulevard Line: June 17, 1956
Gilmor Street Line (Fulton Avenue): August 1, 1948
Carey Street Line: December 13, 1948
Pennsylvania Avenue Line: June 8, 1952
Liberty Heights Avenue Line: September 4, 1955
Park Heights Avenue Line (Pimlico; Pikesville): June 27, 1948
Emory Grove Line: July 3, 1932
Druid Hill Avenue Line: June 27, 1948
Madison Avenue Line: May 9, 1948
Linden Avenue Line: September 4, 1955
John Street Line: December 2, 1938

Cross connections and branches
Bay Shore Line: September 1947
Brunswick Street Line
Caroline Street Line (Central): March 6, 1938
Centre Street Line: August 1937?
Dolphin Street Line: March 6, 1938
East Federal Street Line: January 1, 1939
Fairfield Line
Fish House Road Line: July 30, 1932
Fort Howard Line: October 20, 1952
Fremont Avenue Line: March 25, 1950
Gorsuch Avenue Line (Waverly): June 22, 1947
Key Avenue Line: September 14, 1950
Lorraine Line: February 28, 1954
North Avenue Line: January 10, 1954
Presstman Street Line: December 15, 1919
Preston Street Line: January 1, 1939
Sweetair Line
Union Avenue Line: April 24, 1949
Washington Street Line (Wolfe Street): March 5, 1950
West Arlington Line (Belvedere; Mount Washington): September 4, 1955 (September 14, 1950, east of Belvedere)
Woodlawn Line (Gwynn Oak Park; Powhatan): September 4, 1955 (June 10, 1917, west of Woodlawn)

See also
List of surface transit routes in the Baltimore Metropolitan Area
Baltimore Streetcar Museum
 History of MTA Maryland

References

External links
1915 United Railways & Electric Company photo survey - Ghosts of Baltimore blog
“Photograph album: Album 3 of the President's Collection of United Railways and Electric Company of Baltimore, 1910-1917.” Digital Maryland. Retrieved 2021-03-23.

Maryland Transit Administration
Defunct Maryland railroads
History of Baltimore
5 ft 4½ in gauge railways